Akhtala is a town in the Lori Province of Armenia.

Akhtala may also refer to:

 Akhtala (Gurjaani), a spa in Georgia
 Akhtala Monastery, in Akhtala, Armenia

See also
 Verin Akhtala, a village in the Lori Province of Armenia